James T. Jennings (April 1818 – March 22, 1865) was a Union Army soldier in the American Civil War who received the U.S. military's highest decoration, the Medal of Honor.

Jennings was born in Devonshire, England in 1818 and entered service at Bucks County, Pennsylvania. He was awarded the Medal of Honor, for extraordinary heroism shown at Weldon Railroad, Virginia on August 20, 1864  during the Battle of Globe Tavern, while serving as a Private with Company K, 56th Pennsylvania Infantry. His Medal of Honor was issued on 1 December 1864.

Jennings died at the age of 46, on March 22, 1865 and was buried at Loudon Park National Cemetery  in Baltimore.

Medal of Honor citation

References

External links

1818 births
1865 deaths
American Civil War recipients of the Medal of Honor
English-born Medal of Honor recipients
English emigrants to the United States
Union Army soldiers
United States Army Medal of Honor recipients